Kilmacabea is a Gaelic Athletic Association club based in the villages of Leap, Glandore and Connagh in County Cork, Ireland. The club is affiliated to Cork GAA and plays in the Carbery division. The club has a very strong tradition in Gaelic football but sometimes plays hurling also. In 2008, the club combined with Carbery Rangers to field a Minor Hurling team called St. Fachtna's which won the Cork Minor C Hurling Championship.

Achievements
 Cork Minor C Hurling Championship Winners (1) 2008 (as part of St. Fachtna's)
 Cork Minor C Football Championship Runner-Up 2008
 Cork Junior B Football Championship Winner (1) 1994
 Cork Minor A Football League Runner-Up 1994
 Cork non exam Minor championship Winner (1) 2007 Runner-Up 2005 2008
 Cork Minor C Football league Winner (1) 2005 Runner-Up 2008
 West Cork Junior A Football Championship (2) 2017, 2018
 West Cork Junior A Football League Winner (3) 2006, 2015, 2017
 West Cork Junior B Football Championship Winners (3) 1971, 1982, 1994  Runner-Up 1980, 1981, 1993
 West Cork Junior C Football Championship  (3) 2004, 2012, 2013 Runner-Up 2005
 West Cork Junior D Football Championship  (3) 1993, 2005, 2012
 West Cork Minor A Football Championship  (2) 1993, 1994
 West Cork Minor B Football Championship  (1) 1998  Runner-Up 1966, 1969 (as Leap)
 West Cork Minor C Football Championship  Runner-Up 2003, 2004, 2008, 2009
 West Cork Under-21 A Football Championship  Runner-Up 1973
 West Cork Under-21 B Football Championship  (8) 1991, 1992, 1999, 2004, 2007, 2008, 2013, 2017  Runner-Up 2001, 2003, 2006
 West Cork Under-21 B Hurling Championship  (1) 1972

References

External links
Kilmacabea GAA Website

Gaelic games clubs in County Cork
Hurling clubs in County Cork
Gaelic football clubs in County Cork